Metriochroa pergulariae is a moth of the family Gracillariidae. It is known from South Africa.

The larvae feed on Pergularia daemia and Pergularia extensa. They mine the leaves of their host plant. The mine has the form of a very long, narrow, irregularly contorted gallery on the upper side of the leaf.

References

Endemic moths of South Africa
Phyllocnistinae
Moths of Africa